Louis Lavergne (December 1, 1845 – February 15, 1931) was a Canadian politician.

Born in St. Pierre de Montmagny, Canada East, Lavergne was educated at the Collège Sainte-Anne-de-la-Pocatière. A notary by profession, Lavergne was first elected to the House of Commons of Canada for the riding of Drummond—Arthabaska in an 1897 by-election, after his brother, Joseph Lavergne, the current MP was appointed Puisne Judge of the Superior  Court of the Province of Quebec. A Liberal, Lavergne was acclaimed in the 1900 election and re-elected in 1904 and 1908. In 1910, he was summoned to the Senate of Canada representing the senatorial division of Kennebec, Quebec on the advice of Wilfrid Laurier. He served until 1930.

His nephew, Armand Renaud Lavergne, was also an MP.

References
 
 The Canadian Parliament; biographical sketches and photo-engravures of the senators and members of the House of Commons of Canada. Being the tenth Parliament, elected November 3, 1904

1845 births
1931 deaths
Canadian senators from Quebec
Liberal Party of Canada MPs
Liberal Party of Canada senators
Members of the House of Commons of Canada from Quebec